Christian Social Party (in Spanish: Partido Social Cristiano) was a political party in Peru. Its president was Baltazar Caravedo.

See Christian Social Party of Peru

Christian political parties
Defunct political parties in Peru
Political parties with year of disestablishment missing
Political parties with year of establishment missing